Randolph "Randall" or "Ole Ran'l" McCoy (October 30, 1825 – March 28, 1914) was the patriarch of the McCoy clan involved in the infamous American Hatfield–McCoy feud. He was born the fourth of thirteen children to Daniel McCoy (1790–1885) and Margaret Taylor McCoy (1800–1868) and lived mostly on the Kentucky side of Tug Fork, a tributary of the Big Sandy River.

During the almost thirty-year feud with the Hatfield clan under their patriarch Devil Anse Hatfield, Randolph would lose five of his children to the violence.

Marriage, family, and children
Randolph McCoy (1825–1914) married his first cousin, Sarah "Sally" McCoy (1829 – c. 1890), daughter of Samuel McCoy (1782–1855) and Elizabeth Davis, on December 9, 1849, in Pike County, Kentucky. They were of Scottish descent and had 17 children together. Their children were:

 Josephine McCoy, daughter (1848–), (US 1870 Census lists Josephine alive at age 23);
 James "Jim" McCoy, son (1849–1929), died after the feud;
 Floyd McCoy, son (1853–1928), died after the feud; 
 Tolbert McCoy, son (1854–1882), killed during the feud, executed by the Hatfields for murdering Ellison Hatfield, Sr;
 Lilburn McCoy, son (1855–1855), died at a young age;
 Samuel McCoy II, son (1856–1921), died after the feud;
 Alifair McCoy, daughter (1858–1888), killed during the feud, murdered by "Cotton Top" Ellison Hatfield, Jr, during an assault on the McCoy farm;
 Roseanna McCoy, daughter (1859–1888), died during the feud, illness;
 Calvin McCoy, son (1862–1888), killed during the feud, murdered by Johnson "Johnse" Hatfield during an assault on the McCoy farm;
 Pharmer McCoy, son (1863–1882), killed during the feud, executed by the Hatfields for murdering Ellison Hatfield, Sr;
 Randolph "Bud" McCoy, son (1864–1882), killed during the feud, executed by the Hatfields for murdering Ellison Hatfield, Sr;
 Kay McCoy, daughter (1865–?), died after the feud;
 William "Bill" McCoy, son (1868–?), died after the feud;
 Trinvilla "Trinnie" McCoy, daughter (1868–?), died after the feud;
 Adelaide McCoy, daughter (1870–?), died after the feud;
 Fannie McCoy, daughter (1873–1943), died after the feud;
 Mary Katherine McCoy, daughter (1875–?), died after the feud;

Their most prominent child was Roseanna McCoy, most known for her relationship with Johnse Hatfield, with whom she had a daughter, Sarah Elizabeth (named for her Grandmother and Great-Grandmother). Johnse Hatfield later married Nancy McCoy, a cousin of Roseanna.

Samuel McCoy (1782–1855) and Daniel McCoy (1790–1885) were sons of "Old" William McCoy (April 1751 – 1822) and according to 111 Y-DNA results, likely nephews of Richard McCoy (abt. 1752 – 1792) of New River area, Montgomery County, Virginia.

Samuel McCoy's sons included:
John McCoy (b. abt. 1806), married Margaret "Peggy" Burress (b. abt. 1815);
Asa Harmon McCoy (1809–1884), married Eleanor "Nellie" Burress (1808-abt. 1879), whose son Selkirk McCoy (1833–1908) married Louisa Maynard; and
William McCoy (b. abt. 1811), married Mary A. Burress (b. abt. 1821), whose daughter Elizabeth McCoy (b. abt. 1838) married Ephram Hatfield.
As noted above, Samuel McCoy's daughter Sarah "Sally" McCoy (1829–1890) married Randolph McCoy (1825–1914), son of her uncle Daniel McCoy.

The 3 Burress women were daughters of Micajah Burress (1775–1850) and a Rachel McCoy, who married on 15 October 1795 in Montgomery County, Virginia. This Rachel was either the daughter of Richard McCoy (abt. 1752 – 1792) and Susanna Moore (1755–1830) of New River area, Montgomery County, Virginia, or she was another Rachel McCoy. Another daughter of Richard McCoy and Susanna Moore, Nancy McCoy (b. abt. 1782), married Thomas Jefferson McColley (1780–1842) in Montgomery County, Virginia on 7 June 1803. "Old" William McCoy's daughter Nancy has erroneously been linked as married to Thomas Jefferson McColley. It is believed William Harmon McCoy, son of Richard McCoy and brother of Nancy McCoy (m. Thomas Jefferson McColley) is the "William" that signed Nancy's marriage bond since her father Richard, predeceased her marriage to McColley. The fact that "Old" William's daughter Nancy McCoy (b. abt. 1784-d. bef. 1823) married Thomas McColley is disproven is documented in the 1842 Will of Thomas Jefferson McColley who lists his "living" wife Nancy. Nancy McCoy, daughter of "Old" William died in 1823.

Richard McCoy and Susanna Moore of New River area, Virginia, also had a son William Harmon McCoy (1780–1855). Richard's son William was the first of known record to have the name "Harmon" which subsequently was given to 2 of "Old" William's grandsons: Asa Harmon McCoy (1809–1884), son of Samuel McCoy and to Asa Harmon McCoy (1828–1865), son of Daniel – both Samuel and Daniel were sons of "Old" William McCoy.

Perry Cline and wife Elizabeth Riffe were parents of Sarah Ann Cline (1785–1865) born in Montgomery County, Virginia, and Jacob "Rich Jake" Cline (1790–1858), also born in Montgomery County, Virginia. Sarah Cline alleged that she had a child out of wedlock in 1803 with George H. McCoy (1784–1870), son of Richard McCoy and Susanna Moore of New River area Montgomery County, Virginia. George H. McCoy married Martha "Patsy" A. Kirk about 1805.

"Rich Jake" Cline and Nancy Fuller were parents of:
Perry A. Cline (1849–1891), who married Martha Adkins; and
Martha "Patty" Cline (1828–1907), who married Asa Harmon McCoy, son of Daniel McCoy.

Feud

During the American Civil War, the feud leaders from both families were staunchly pro-Confederate, and Randolph himself served in the 45th Virginia Infantry Battalion Confederate Army during the opening years of the war and was a POW from 1863 to 1865. He later returned to Kentucky. However, Randolph's younger brother, Asa Harmon McCoy, enlisted in the Union Army as "Asa H McCay" in Co E of the 45th Kentucky Infantry USA. He was discharged from the Union Army on December 24, 1864, after suffering a broken leg, and returned home. Soon after his return, Jim Vance, uncle of Devil Anse Hatfield, and a member of the "Logan Wildcats" militia put Asa Harmon on notice that they (the Wildcats) would soon be paying him, "a visit." Asa Harmon McCoy tried to escape by hiding out in a local cave, but was tracked to his hideout and killed. No charges were ever filed but it was widely known that Vance and members of Hatfield's Wildcats were directly responsible for his death.

In the late 1870s, Devil Anse Hatfield was involved in a land dispute with Randolph McCoy's cousin, Perry Cline, over a 5,000-acre tract of land that both held title to. Hatfield eventually brought a civil suit against Cline. Hatfield won in what was seen by the McCoys as a Hatfield-friendly court.

In the fall of 1878, Randolph "Randall" McCoy brought charges against Floyd Hatfield for stealing one of his hogs. This allegation was a very serious offense at the time, as hogs were extremely valuable to the farming economy. Due to the statements made by Bill Staton, who was related to both families, the case was decided in favor of the Hatfields. The ruling further inflamed the feud, as Randolph McCoy viewed the outcome as unfair. Later, brothers Sam and Paris McCoy were accused, tried, and acquitted of the death of Staton when the judge ruled Staton's death an act of self-defense by the McCoy brothers.

Randall's daughter Roseanna McCoy romanced "Johnse" Hatfield and later became pregnant with Johnse's child. Upon learning of the affair, Randolph became extremely upset and disowned her. Roseanna, unwanted by both families, moved in with her uncle Uriah and "Aunt Betty" Elizabeth (Rutherford) McCoy. Johnse later married Roseanna's cousin, Nancy McCoy. Roseanna's baby died before her first birthday and the abandoned Roseanna died at the age of 29.

The peak of the feuding occurred when three of Randolph's sons (Roseanna's brothers) killed Ellison Hatfield, brother of Devil Anse, on election day in 1882. Devil Anse retaliated for the killing of his brother by executing, without trial, Tolbert (b. 1854), Pharmer (b. 1863) and Randolph Jr. (b. 1864), three sons of Randolph McCoy near present-day Matewan, West Virginia.

On January 1, 1888, "Cap" Hatfield and Jim Vance led several members of the Hatfield family to attack the McCoy cabin. Randolph's house was burned to the ground and numerous family members were slain by the Hatfields, including two of Randolph's children. His son Calvin was killed in the shootout as was his daughter, Alifair, who was shot to death as she tried to flee the burning house. Randolph's wife Sally was badly injured when she attempted to comfort Alifair, suffering several broken ribs and skull fractures. She survived the beating but was disabled for the rest of her life. With his house burning, Randolph and his remaining family members were able to escape to the woods; unfortunately, his children, unprepared for the elements, suffered frostbite. He moved his family to Pikeville, Kentucky, where he lived out the remainder of his life in bitterness and grieving. He operated a ferry in Pikeville for some time, and the home he lived in still stands at the intersection of Main Street and Scott Avenue. By the end of the feud, he had lost seven of his children and his wife.

Shortly after the New Year's massacre, Kentucky deputy Frank Phillips and a posse of McCoys chased down Jim Vance and Cap Hatfield, killing Vance. Phillips' posse rounded up nine Hatfield family members and supporters and hauled them off to jail.

Death
Randolph McCoy died at the age of 88 after he was severely burned from a cooking fire. He is buried in the Dils Cemetery in Pikeville, next to his wife who died in the 1890s.

Conclusion

In 1888, Wall Hatfield and eight others were arrested by a posse led by Frank Phillips and brought to Kentucky to stand trial for the murder of Alifair McCoy, who was killed during the New Year's Massacre.

The feuding and warfare brought in political leaders of Kentucky and West Virginia. The governor of West Virginia, E. Willis Wilson, accused Kentucky of violating the extradition process and appealed the matter to the Supreme Court of the United States. Kentucky Governor Simon Bolivar Buckner sent his Adjutant General to Pike County to investigate the situation. In May 1889, the Supreme Court decided against West Virginia (Mahon v. Justice); the nine Hatfields would be tried in Pikeville. Private detectives hunted down many Hatfields, though Devil Anse was never tried nor jailed. In 1890, Ellison Mounts was executed in Kentucky for his part in the McCoy killings. He was one of the men captured along with Mahon. The feud started to wind down with Mounts' execution.

On June 14, 2003, the McCoy cousins partnered with Reo Hatfield of Waynesboro, Virginia, to author an official truce between the families. The idea was symbolic: to show that Americans could bury their differences and unite in times of crisis.

References

External links
The Story of the McCoys: The Facts, The Feud, The Fury! By Barry McCoy Author/Hatfield McCoy Feud Historian. 

Civil War Album, The Hatfield-McCoy Feud Pike County, Kentucky
 Hatfield - McCoy Feud Driving Tour information
 Listen online – The Story of the Hatfields and McCoys – The American Storyteller Radio Journal 
 Hatfield–McCoy Feud West Virginia Division of Culture and History
 Hatfield–McCoy Feud; Roseanna: Juliet of the Mountains; from Blue Ridge Country, March/April 1996.
National Guard History eMuseum Report from the Adjutant General of Kentucky, 1888 to the Kentucky Senate

People from Pike County, Kentucky
People of the American Civil War
Confederate States Army soldiers
People of Kentucky in the American Civil War
American Civil War prisoners of war
Confederate States Army personnel
American people of Scottish descent
American bootleggers
Bushwhackers
Accidental deaths in Kentucky
Deaths from fire in the United States
Burials in Kentucky
1825 births
1914 deaths